The speaker of the Parliament of Finland (Finnish eduskunnan puhemies, Swedish riksdagens talman), along with two deputy speakers, is elected by Parliament during the first plenary session each year. Speakers are chosen for a year at a time. In addition to their preparing the work in plenary sessions the speakers also play a key role in Parliament's international co-operation, which includes visits by speakers and international delegations as well as participation in numerous interparliamentary organisations.

The speaker and two deputy speakers are elected by parliament from among its members by secret ballot. After the election the speaker and deputy speakers each make the following solemn affirmation before Parliament:

"I, ..., affirm that in my office as speaker I will to the best of my ability defend the rights of the people, parliament and the government of Finland according to the Constitution."

Formally, the speaker ranks second in the protocol, after the president of Finland and before the prime minister of Finland. An interim speaker is elected for the duration of government formation talks.

The title puhemies or talman has, both in Finnish and Swedish, the literal meaning 'spokesman', which has caused mild controversies in terms of sexism in language. However, according to official language authorities, the title is not easy to change to a more gender-neutral alternative due to its "strong connection to the institution and history of the Parliament".

List of speakers of the Parliament of Finland

List of deputy speakers

First deputy speakers

Second deputy speakers

See also 
Parliament of Finland
Diet of Finland
Lantmarskalks of the Finnish House of Nobility

References

External links

 www.eduskunta.fi

 
Finland
Speakers
1907 establishments in Finland